Paraptila is a genus of moths belonging to the family Tortricidae.

Species
Paraptila argocosma  Meyrick, 1912
Paraptila biserrata  Brown, 1991
Paraptila bloomfieldi  Brown, 1991
Paraptila cornucopis  (Walsingham, 1914) 
Paraptila equadora Brown, 1991
Paraptila gamma  (Walsingham, 1914) 
Paraptila pseudogamma  Brown, 1991
Paraptila symmetricana  Brown, 1991

References

 , 2005: World Catalogue of Insects volume 5 Tortricidae.
  1912: Transactions of the Entomological Society of London 1911: 677.

External links
tortricidae.com

Euliini
Taxa named by Edward Meyrick
Tortricidae genera